Irena Litvinovič (born 23 August 1958, Vilnius, Lithuania) is Polish-Lithuanian educator, theatre director, politician and cultural activist for the community of Poles in Lithuania.

In 1991 she graduated from the Leningrad Institute of Culture with specialty of theatre director. Since 1992 she is artistic director and (theatre) director of the Polish Theater in Vilnius (pro bono), as well as the manager of  the theatre studio at the Adam Mickiewicz Gymnasium in Vilnius (employment).

She is the member of the Vilnius city council for terms 2003-2007 and 2007-2011.

She is married to Česlav Litvinovič and has daughter Barbara.

She speaks in Polish, Lithuanian, German, and Russian.

Awards
Her awards and decorations include:

2010: Knight's Cross of the Order of Merit of the Republic of Poland
2004: Honorary badge 
2002: Gold Cross of Merit (Poland)

References

Lithuanian people of Polish descent
Lithuanian theatre directors
21st-century Lithuanian women politicians
21st-century Lithuanian politicians
Lithuanian municipal councillors
Living people
1958 births
Politicians from Vilnius